Merinthopodium is a genus of flowering plants belonging to the family Solanaceae.

Its native range is Central America to Venezuela.

Species:

Merinthopodium neuranthum 
Merinthopodium pendulum 
Merinthopodium vogelii

References

Solanaceae
Solanaceae genera